Gréolières is a commune in the Alpes-Maritimes department in southeastern France.

Population

See also
Communes of the Alpes-Maritimes department

References

External links
The history and life of Gréolières Village in English
Gréolières-les-Neiges - all about this great little ski resort, in English

Communes of Alpes-Maritimes
Alpes-Maritimes communes articles needing translation from French Wikipedia